Disney's BoardWalk Resort is a hotel and entertainment complex at the Walt Disney World resort in Bay Lake, Florida, near Orlando, Florida. First opened in 1996, the BoardWalk Resort is located in the Epcot Resort Area, alongside Crescent Lake, and is situated between Epcot and Disney's Hollywood Studios. The resort is owned and operated by Disney Parks, Experiences and Products. The inn and the villas share a common lobby with the rest of the resort. The Inn, Atlantic Dance Hall, and other features of the boardwalk were designed by Robert A.M. Stern Architects.

Description

Entertainment district
Several restaurants are present on the BoardWalk, including the Big River Grille & Brewing Works, the only microbrewery at Walt Disney World; and Kouzzina, a Mediterranean cuisine restaurant opened by celebrity chef Cat Cora. As of December 2014, a new restaurant called Trattoria al Forno, serving family style Italian cuisine, replaced Kouzzina.

Dining: Disney's Boardwalk Resort offers many dining options both on the Boardwalk and inside the resort.
Big River Grille & Brewing Works — On the Villas side of the BoardWalk.
BoardWalk Deli — Various sandwiches are sold here. This replaced BoardWalk Bakery in 2022.
Flying Fish Cafe — A seafood restaurant on the Inn side of the BoardWalk. 
Trattoria al Forno — A restaurant featuring Italian cuisine.
BoardWalk Ice Cream — Operating in the former ESPN Yard Arcade/ESPN Club Store building on the Inn side of the Boardwalk, this replaced the closed Ample Hills Creamery in 2021.
Pizza Window - Located next to Trattoria al Forno.
Shopping: Disney's Boardwalk Resort offers many shopping options, both on the Boardwalk and inside the resort.

Pools: Disney's BoardWalk has two dedicated pools. The feature pool at Disney's BoardWalk is the Luna Park Pool, which is themed after a 1920s-1940s carnival. The Luna Park Pool features the 200-foot Keister Coaster Water Slide. Also in the Luna Park area is a play area for young children. There is one other pool at the villas. This "quiet pool" is located near Community Hall. Other recreational activities at Disney's Boardwalk Villas include surrey bike rentals and tennis courts.
Nightlife:
Atlantic Dance Hall — Located at the far end of the villas on the BoardWalk. 
Abracadabar — Located next to Trattoria Al Forno, Abracadabar offers drinks and magician entertainment.
Jellyrolls — Also on the far end of Disney's BoardWalk Villas, Jellyrolls is a dueling piano bar that is open to guests 21 years of age and older. To enter Jellyrolls, you must present a photo-identification. There is a fee to enter Jellyrolls during normal operating hours.

Inn
One of Walt Disney World's "deluxe resorts," the BoardWalk Inn contains décor inspired by the seaside districts of the Northeastern United States during the 20th century. The Inn is a short walk or FriendShip boat ride from the other resorts around Crescent Lake, as well as Epcot and Disney's Hollywood Studios. It is located directly across the lake from the Yacht and Beach Club resorts.

Villas
Part of the Disney Vacation Club properties at Walt Disney World, the villas feature large multi-bedroom suites.

References

External links

Boardwalk Inn
Hotels established in 1996
Hotel buildings completed in 1996
1996 establishments in Florida
Disney Vacation Club